Hai Halla is an Indore swachhta (cleanliness) celebration song. Indore Municipal Corporation and Rishiking created the song. It was sung by Shaan and Payal Dev, composed by Rishiking and conceived by P Narahari.  After the song's success and Swachh Survekshan 2017 (monument held in 2017), Indore was recognized as India's cleanest city.

Release
This song was released on 1 June 2017, by Venkaiah Naidu, Sumitra Mahajan and Shivraj Singh Chouhan. The song became very popular among Indore residents after its release.

Success and impact
Rishikesh Pandey popularized the campaign with Hai Halla. After the campaign's success, Hai Halla became even more popular, a regular part of the sangeet ceremony of marriage functions. The song has more than 1 million views on YouTube.

Musical Show

Indore Municipal Corporation organized a show called "Grand halla". People listened to the voice of Rishikesh Pandey and Shan on 23 December 2017. The show was free and around 45,000 residents took part.

References

External links
 
 

2017 songs
Indore